Kumaoni (
) is an Indo-Aryan language spoken by over two million people of the Kumaon region of the state of Uttarakhand in northern India and parts of Doti region in Western Nepal. As per 1961 survey there were 1,030,254 Kumaoni speakers in India. The number of speakers increased to 2.2 million in 2011.

Kumaoni is not endangered but UNESCO's Atlas of the World's Languages in Danger designates it as a language in the unsafe category, meaning it requires consistent conservation efforts.

Script
Kumaoni uses the Devanagari script.

Geographic distribution and dialects
There are several dialects spoken in the Kumaon region. There is not single accepted method of dividing up the dialects of Kumaoni. Broadly speaking, Kali (or Central) Kumaoni is spoken in Almora and northern Nainital. North-eastern Kumaoni is spoken in Pithoragarh. South-eastern Kumaoni is spoken in South-eastern Nainital. Western Kumaoni is spoken west of Almora and Nainital.

More specifically:
 Johari of the Malla and Talla Johar (Milam, Munsiyari)
 Askoti of Askot
 Bhabhri of Haldwani and Ramnagar

 Danpuriya of Danpur (Bageshwar, Kapkot)
 Gangoli of Ganai-Gangoli (Kanda, Berinag, Gangolihat)
 Khasparjiya of Almora
 Kumaiyya of Champawat
 Pachhai of Pali-Pachhhau (Ranikhet, Dwarahat)

 Phaldakotiya of Phaldkot
 Rhau-Chaubyansi, (Nainital)
 Sirali of Sirakot (Didihat)
 Soriyali of Sor Valley (Pithoragarh)

Some Kumaoni speakers are also reportedly found in Western Nepal.

History
 

Various Kumaoni text founded from the katyuri and chand era on temple stones and as copper plate inscriptions. Kumaoni was official language of Kumaon Kingdom.

Phonology

Consonants 

Vowels 

  can be heard as either back  or central  in free variation.

Grammar
Being part of the Indo-Aryan dialect continuum Kumauni shares its grammar with other Indo-Aryan languages like Dotyali, Nepali, Hindi, Rajasthani, Kashmiri and Gujarati.
It shares much of its grammar with the other language of the Central Pahari group like Garhwali. 
The peculiarities of grammar in Kumaoni and other Central Pahari languages exist due to the influence of the now extinct language of the Khasas, the first inhabitants of the region. 
In Kumauni the verb substantive is formed from the root ach, as in both Rajasthani and Kashmiri. In Rajasthani its present tense, being derived from the Sanskrit present rcchami, I go, does not change for gender. But in Pahari and Kashmiri it must be derived from the rare Sanskrit particle *rcchitas, gone, for in these languages it is a participial tense and does change according to the gender of the subject. Thus, in the singular we have: - Here we have a relic of the old Khasa language, which, as has been said, seems to have been related to Kashmiri. Other relics of Khasa, again agreeing with north-western India, are the tendency to shorten long vowels, the practice of epenthesis, or the modification of a vowel by the one which follows in the next syllable, and the frequent occurrence of disaspiration. Thus, Khas siknu, Kumauni sikhno, but Hindi sikhna, to learn; Kumauni yeso, plural yasa, of this kind.

Verb conjugation
Conjugation of the verb Lekh (लेख) to write, in all three tenses in Kumaoni.

Present tense

Past tense

Future tense

Example short phrases

Official Status
There have been demands to include Kumaoni along with Garhwali in the 8th schedule of the Constitution of India so that it could be made one of the Scheduled Language of India.
In 2010, a private member's bill was introduced for discussion in the Lok Sabha whose aim was to include Garhwali and Kumaoni in the Eighth Schedule of the Constitution.

However In a step to promote and protect indigenous languages in December 2019 Government of the state introduced Official Kumaoni Books for Classes 1-5 students of kumaon division Schools.

Kumaoni literature
Kumaoni language has had many noteworthy writers, prominent among them are
 Lokratna Pant or Gumani Pant (1790–1846)
 Gauri Dutt Pant "Gaurda" (1872-1939)
 Charu Chandra Pandey (1923–2017)
 Shailesh Matiyani (1931–2001)
 Mohan Upreti (1925–1997)
 Brijen Lal Shah (1928-1998)

Media and art

Films
 Megha Aa, (First Kumaoni Film). Director Kaka Sharma, Produced S S Bisht, 1987
 Teri Saun, (First film both in Kumaoni and Garhwali), written, produced, and directed by Anuj Joshi, 2003.
 Aapun Biraan (Apne Paraye) by Shri Kartikey Cine Productions. Written by Rajendra Bora (Tribhuvan Giri). Produced by Bhaskar Singh Rawat. 2007.
 Madhuli by Anamika Film, 2008.
 Aapke Liye, a 1985 TV show aired in Doordarshan Directed by sharbat sanzarr and presented by Mohan Manral showcases the kumaoni mela "kauteek".

Theatre
Kumaoni theatre which developed through its 'Ramleela' plays, later evolved into a modern theatre form with the efforts of theatre stalwarts like Mohan Upreti, Naima Khan Upreti and Dinesh Pandey, and groups like 'Parvatiya Kala Kendra' (started by Mohan Upreti) and 'Parvatiya Lok Kala Manch'.  "Ankhar" of Lucknow did a very good work in the field of kumaoni theater. Ankhar played a number of kumauni plays like "mee yo gayun, mee yo satkyun" writer Nand Kumar Upreti, "Punturi" by Charu Chandra Pandey, "Motor Road" by Govind Ballabh Pant, "Labh Ribhadi" writer Nand Kumar Upreti, "Kagare Aag" and "Tumhare Liye" by Himanshu Joshi, Kumauni translation Naveeen Joshi and कुमाउनी नाटक-जैल थै, वील पै.

Folk music 

Musical instruments used in Kumaon music include the, and. Tabla and harmonium are also used, but to a lesser extent.

Some prominent singers are:
Mohan Upreti, the most famous personality associated with Kumaoni folk music, who is known for his Nanda Devi Jagar & Rajula Malu Shahi Ballad. He is famous for the great Kumaoni song Bedu Pako Baro Masa which for many years the identity of the hills of Uttarakahand. It is said this song was also a favourite of Pandit Jawahar Lal Nehru who heard it in a band march as this song is also a popular marching song.
 Naima Khan Upreti - She was the wife of Mohan Upreti and was a prominent folk singer. Mohan Upreti and Naima Upreti used to sing folk songs as a duet and they also made the first HMV recording of songs like Bedu Pako and O Lali, O Lali Haushiya. Naima Upreti had collected a large number of songs of the Kumaon and Garhwal region and she rendered them on several occasions. 
Gopal Babu Goswami - who is considered to be a legend in Kumaon for his melodious voice. His songs on the life of the members of the armed forces and their families like Kaile baje muruli, Ghughuti na basa (Hirda cassettes) and many others are legendary, it is said that when these songs were transmitted on All India Radio women could not help but weep when they heard the soul touching voice of Gopal Da as he was lovingly called.
Heera Singh Rana - identified as a contemporary poet and singer who touched upon various shades of hill life, particularly the plight of women. Besides beauty, love, and romance, his poetry illustrates pains and sufferings and are sharp in satire on the political class.

Radio
 In 1962, a new programme was introduced from Akashwani Lucknow- "Utterayana". this programme was specially for the Chinese border area. Jay dev sharma "kamal" Banshidhar Pathak Jigyasu and Jeet Singh Jardhari started this programme. Najeebabad Akashwani kendra relayed this programme .
With the aim to create a common platform for local communities of Supi in Uttarakhand, TERI launched 'Kumaon vani', a community radio service on 11 March 2010. Uttarakhand Governor Margaret Alva inaugurated the community radio station, the first in the state. The 'Kumaon Vani' aims to air programmes on environment, agriculture, culture, weather and education in the local language and with the active participation of the communities.  The radio station covers a radius of 10 km reaching out to almost 2000 locals around Mukhteshwar
 In order to create a folk genome tank of Uttarakhand where one can find each genre and occasions in the form of folk music, and to bring the melodious folk from the heart of Himalaya on global screen, the very first internet radio of Kumaon/Garhwal/Jaunsar was launched in year 2008 by a group of non-resident Uttarakhandi from New York, which has been gaining significant popularity among inhabitants and migrants since its beta version was launched in year 2010. This was named after a very famous melody of hills of Himalaya, Bedupako Baramasa O Narain Kafal Pako Chaita Bedupako

See also
Kumaon
Kumauni People
Kumaon Kingdom
List of languages by number of native speakers in India

References

Further reading

Dr. Shashi Pandey, Ramesh Ch Pandey, Rama Pandey: Uttarakhandi Lokoktiyan (Published 2014, Kumaoni and Garhwali Editions)
 Devidatta Sarma; Linguistic geography of Kumaun Himalayas: A descriptive areal distribution of Kumauni language (Studies in Tibeto-Himalayan languages). Mittal Publications; 1994. .
 Devidatta Sarma; The formation of Kumauni language (SILL : series in Indian languages and linguistics). Bahri Publications; 1985.

External links

 Kumaoni Language and Literature
 UNESCO
 Uttarakhandi Lokoktiyan (Kumaoni Sanskaran)

Northern Indo-Aryan languages
Languages of Uttarakhand
Kumaon division
Endangered languages of India
Languages of Sudurpashchim Province